Məmişlər (also, Mamishlar and Mamyshlyar, known as Şaumyanovka until 1992) is a village and municipality in the Sabirabad Rayon of Azerbaijan.  It has a population of 1,433.

References 

Populated places in Sabirabad District